The European Zone of qualification for the 2015 Rugby World Cup saw 31 teams competing for two places at the finals in England and one place in the Repechage playoff. Georgia and Romania qualified directly to the Rugby World Cup as Europe 1 and Europe 2, and will play in Pools C and D respectively. Russia finished third to qualify for the repechage playoff, but losing to Uruguay in the final Qualification round.

Format
31 national teams from FIRA–AER (which changed its name to Rugby Europe during the qualifying cycle) entered qualification, and two or three teams could qualify for the 2015 World Cup. The qualification format was the same as that used for 2011 competition. The teams competed in two groups of six teams, three groups of five and one group of four. There were two levels of playoff. The direct qualification to the 2015 Rugby World Cup (Round 5) took place in the 2012–2014 European Nations Cup - Division 1A, with Georgia and Romania qualifying directly to the 2015 Rugby World Cup as Europe 1 and Europe 2.

Each winning team in the 2012-2013 European Nations Cup Division 2 played off in succession, starting with the lowest two divisions. After the 2013–14 season, the winning team from Division 2 (Netherlands) played off against the winner of Division 1B (Germany). Germany won this match and played off against Russia, who finished third in Division 1A. Russia won this match and qualified for the repechage. No team from the 2012–14 3rd division tournament was eligible to qualify for the Rugby World Cup.

Entrants
The 2015 Rugby World Cup qualifying teams that competed for the 2015 Rugby World Cup – European qualification. (World rankings, shown in brackets, are to first European qualification match on 6 October 2012)

  (84)
  (62)
  (23)
  (87)
  (79)
  (44)
  (40)
  (61)
  (96)
  (15)
  (31)
  (NR)
  (85)
  (56)
  (72)
  (36)
  (95)
  (45)
  (34)
  (47)
  (93)
  (28)
  (26)
  (18)
  (19)
  (73)
  (81)
  (20)
  (38)
  (52)
  (30)

Qualified nations

  (Automatic qualifier)
  (Automatic qualifier)
  (Europe 1)
  (Automatic qualifier)
  (Automatic qualifier)
  (Europe 2)
  (Automatic qualifier)
  (Automatic qualifier)

Round 1

Round 1A: European Nations Cup Division 2D 2012–13
The winner of Round 1A, Luxembourg, advanced to the Round 1 Final to play the winner of Division 2C, Slovenia. The other four teams were eliminated from Rugby World Cup qualifying.

Round 1B: European Nations Cup Division 2C 2012–13
The winner of Round 1B, Slovenia, advanced to Round 1 Final and will play the winner of Division 2D, Luxembourg. The other three teams were eliminated from Rugby World Cup qualifying.

Round 1 Final
Luxembourg, the winner of Round 1A, defeated Slovenia, the winner of Round 1B, to advance to Round 2 Final to play Israel.

Round 2

Round 2A: European Nations Cup Division 2B 2012–13
The winner of Round 2A, Israel, advanced to Round 2 Final to play the winner of Round 1. The other four teams were eliminated from Rugby World Cup qualifying.

Round 2 Final
Israel, the winner of Round 2A, played the winner of Round 1, Luxembourg, to advance to the Round 3 Final to play Netherlands.

Round 3

Round 3A: European Nations Cup Division 2A 2012–13
The winner of Round 3A, Netherlands, advanced to Round 3 Final to play the winner of Round 2. The other four teams were eliminated from Rugby World Cup qualifying.

Round 3 Final
Netherlands, the winner of Round 3A, played the winner of Round 2, Israel, for the right to advance to Round 4 Final to play the winner of 2012-13 Division 2A, Germany.

Round 4

Round 4A: Division 1B 2012–14
The winner of Division 1B, Germany, advanced to Round 4 Final to play the winner of Round 3. The other five teams were eliminated from Rugby World Cup qualifying.

Round 4 Final
The winner of Round 4A, Germany, defeated Netherlands, the winner of Round 3, for the right to advance to Round 6 Final.

Round 5: European Nations Cup Division 1A 2012–14
The winner of Round 5, Georgia, qualified for the 2015 Rugby World Cup as Europe 1 and will join New Zealand, Argentina, Tonga and Namibia in Pool C. The runner-up, Romania, qualified as Europe 2, joining France, Ireland, Italy and Canada in Pool D. Third place, Russia, advanced to Round 6 to play the winner of Round 4 for the opportunity to qualify for the repechage. Fourth through sixth were eliminated from Rugby World Cup qualifying.

Round 6: Repechage playoff
The winning team from Round 4, Germany, advanced to play the third place team from Round 5, Russia. Russia won and advanced to the repechage.

See also
2012–14 European Nations Cup First Division
2012–14 European Nations Cup Second Division

References

External links
 Rugby World Cup Europe qualification
 Rugby Europe (formerly FIRA–AER)

2015
European
2012–13 in European rugby union
2013–14 in European rugby union

de:Rugby-Union-Weltmeisterschaft 2015/Qualifikation
fr:Coupe du monde de rugby à XV 2015 - Qualifications Europe